Paul M. Lambert Jr. (August 15, 1934 – June 6, 1978) was an American college basketball coach.

Lambert played basketball at William Jewell College in Liberty, Missouri. After graduation, he coached high school basketball in Moberly, Missouri and Boone, Iowa, then obtained a job as an assistant and freshman coach (and head baseball coach) at Drake University.  He got his first college head coaching position at Pittsburg State, where his teams went 44–29 in three seasons. From there, he followed Lou Henson at Hardin–Simmons, compiling a four-year record of 57–47. He then moved to Southern Illinois (SIU), where he led the team to an eight-year record of 126–84. His tenure was punctuated by leading the Salukis to their first Division I NCAA tournament appearance and win, behind star Mike Glenn. Lambert left SIU following the 1977–78 season to become head coach at Auburn.

Lambert died at age 43 in a Columbus, Georgia motel fire on June 6, 1978, prior to coaching a game at Auburn.

Head coaching record

College basketball

References

1934 births
1978 deaths
American men's basketball coaches
American men's basketball players
Basketball coaches from Missouri
Basketball players from Kansas City, Missouri
College men's basketball head coaches in the United States
Drake Bulldogs baseball coaches
Drake Bulldogs men's basketball coaches
Hardin–Simmons Cowboys basketball coaches
High school basketball coaches in the United States
Pittsburg State Gorillas men's basketball coaches
Southern Illinois Salukis men's basketball coaches
Sportspeople from Kansas City, Missouri
William Jewell Cardinals men's basketball players
Deaths from fire in the United States